Maciej Paterski (born 12 September 1986) is a Polish professional road bicycle racer, who currently rides for UCI Continental team .

Career
Born in Kalisz, Paterski left  at the end of the 2013 season, and joined  for the 2014 season. He had quite a successful 2014 season, winning the Tour of Norway and the mountains classification in his native Tour de Pologne. Later that year, he also won the Memoriał Henryka Łasaka. He started the 2015 season in good form, placing 6th at the Vuelta a Murcia and winning the first stage of the Volta a Catalunya. He followed up these promising results with strong placings in some April classics such as the Amstel Gold Race. At the end of April, Paterski dominated the newly organized Tour of Croatia, winning the overall classification, the points classification and the mountains classification plus two stages. In August, he clinched the mountains classification in the Tour de Pologne for the second consecutive year. 2016 proved to be a comparatively lean year with Paterski scoring just one win, stage 6 at the Bałtyk–Karkonosze Tour where he finished second overall. Another highlight was a sixth place at the UCI World Tour event Bretagne Classic Ouest–France. 2017 was a much more successful season for Paterski with overall victories in the Tour of Małopolska, Szlakiem Walk Majora Hubala and the Coupe des Carpathes.

Major results

2007
 2nd Road race, National Under-23 Road Championships
 2nd Grand Prix Bradlo
2008
 1st Stage 5 Giro delle Regioni
 1st  Points classification Tour de l'Avenir
 3rd Time trial, National Under-23 Road Championships
 3rd Due Giorni Marchigiana
 6th Trofeo Città di San Vendemiano
 9th La Côte Picarde
 10th Road race, UEC European Under-23 Road Championships
2009
 2nd Coppa San Geo
 5th Trofeo Franco Balestra
 5th Trofeo Città di San Vendemiano
 5th Trofeo Alcide Degasperi
 6th Trofeo Zsšdi
2011
 3rd Road race, National Road Championships
 4th Giro del Friuli
 5th Coppa Bernocchi
2013
 3rd Gran Premio Industria e Commercio di Prato
2014
 1st  Overall Tour of Norway
 1st Memoriał Henryka Łasaka
 1st Stage 3a (TTT) Sibiu Cycling Tour
 1st  Mountains classification Tour de Pologne
 8th Memorial Marco Pantani
 9th Volta Limburg Classic
 10th Gran Premio Industria e Commercio di Prato
2015
 1st  Overall Tour of Croatia
1st  Points classification
1st  Mountains classification
1st Stages 3 & 5
 1st Stage 1 Volta a Catalunya
 1st  Mountains classification Tour de Pologne
 2nd Volta Limburg Classic
 6th Vuelta a Murcia
 8th Coppa Ugo Agostoni
 9th Brabantse Pijl
 9th Amstel Gold Race
 10th Velothon Stockholm
2016
 2nd Overall Bałtyk–Karkonosze Tour
1st Stage 6
 4th Overall Course de Solidarność et des Champions Olympiques
 6th Bretagne Classic
 7th Heistse Pijl
2017
 1st  Overall Tour of Małopolska
1st Stages 2 & 3
 1st  Overall Szlakiem Walk Majora Hubala
1st Stage 1
 1st Coupe des Carpathes
 3rd Korona Kocich Gór
 7th Clásica de Almería
2018
 1st  National Hill Climb Championships
 1st Raiffeisen Grand Prix
 1st Minsk Cup
 1st Coupe des Carpathes
 Visegrad 4 Bicycle Race
1st Grand Prix Poland
1st GP Slovakia
2nd GP Czech Republic
 1st Stage 1 Tour of Małopolska
 2nd Overall Okolo Jižních Čech
1st  Points classification
 2nd Overall Course de Solidarność et des Champions Olympiques
 8th Grand Prix Minsk
 8th Grand Prix Doliny Baryczy Milicz
 9th Overall Szlakiem Walk Majora Hubala
2019
 1st  Overall Szlakiem Walk Majora Hubala
1st  Points classification
1st Stages 2b & 3
 1st Raiffeisen Grand Prix
 1st Stage 3 Circuit des Ardennes
 2nd Overall Szlakiem Grodów Piastowskich
1st  Points classification
1st Stages 2 & 3
 2nd Grand Prix Poland, Visegrad 4 Bicycle Race
 2nd Memoriał Andrzeja Trochanowskiego
 4th Memoriał Romana Siemińskiego
 5th Overall Tour of Estonia
 5th Overall Tour du Loir-et-Cher
2020
 1st  Active rider classification Tour de Pologne
 2nd Overall Bałtyk–Karkonosze Tour
 5th Overall Course de Solidarność et des Champions Olympiques
 7th Road race, UEC European Road Championships
2021
 1st  Road race, National Road Championships
 1st  Overall Szlakiem Grodów Piastowskich
1st  Points classification
1st Stage 2
 1st  Mountains classification Tour de Hongrie
 1st  Mountains classification Tour of Romania
 5th Overall Tour of Estonia
 5th Overall Course de Solidarność et des Champions Olympiques
 6th Overall Dookoła Mazowsza
 7th PWZ Zuidenveld Tour
2022
 1st  Overall In the Steps of Romans
1st Stage 1
 1st GP Adria Mobil
 3rd Overall Tour of Szeklerland
 6th Memoriał Andrzeja Trochanowskiego
 8th Overall Tour of Bulgaria

Grand Tour general classification results timeline

References

External links

1986 births
Living people
Polish male cyclists
Sportspeople from Kalisz
Cyclists at the 2015 European Games
European Games competitors for Poland
21st-century Polish people